The 2019–20 Primera División Femenina de Fútbol was the 32nd edition of Spain's highest women's football league, the 19th since the inception of the Superliga Femenina.

On 6 May 2020, the Royal Spanish Football Federation announced the premature end of the league due to the COVID-19 pandemic, revoking relegations and naming Barcelona as league champions five years after their last title. Also, it was approved the expansion of the league to 18 teams for the 2020–21 season.

Overview
Round 9 was postponed due to a strike of the players claiming for a collective agreement to improve their work conditions.

Teams

Deportivo and Tacón promoted from Segunda División. Both teams made their debut in the top tier and replaced Málaga and Fundación Albacete, that were relegated as the two last qualified in the previous edition.

Stadia and locations

Personnel and sponsorship

Managerial changes

List of foreign players
(Italic)Players has come in Winter transfer

Athletic Club
 'no foreign players'
Ex foreign players:
Summer
 THERE ISNT ANY
Winter
 THERE ISNT ANY

Atlético de Madrid
  Sari van Veenendaal
  Carolina Arias
  Elena Linari
  Kenti Robles
  Kylie Strom
  Aïssatou Tounkara
  Alex Chidiac
  Leicy Santos
  Deyna Castellanos
  Verónica Corral
  Toni Duggan
  Ludmilla
  Olha Ovdiychuk
Ex foreign players:
Summer
  Jennifer Oehrli
  Aurélie Kaci
  Dolores Silva
  Viola Calligaris
Winter
  Natiya Pantsulaya

Barcelona
  Pamela Tajonar
  Ana-Maria Crnogorčević
  Stefanie van der Gragt
  Kheira Hamraoui
  Caroline Graham Hansen
  Lieke Martens
  Asisat Oshoala
Ex foreign Players:
Summer
  Andressa Alves
  Nataša Andonova
Winter
 THERE ISNT ANY

Betis
  Anna Buhigas
  Emily Dolan
  Méline Gérard
  Marta Perarnau
  Merel van Dongen
  Samantha Dewey
  Marianela Szymanowski
  Michaela Abam
  Jermaine Seoposenwe
Ex foreign players:
Summer
 THERE ISN'T ANY
Winter
  Marina Fedorova

Deportivo
  Lorena Bedoya
  Carolina Arbeláez
  Kika Moreno
  Maya Yamamoto
  Gabriela García
  Michelle Romero
Ex foreign players:
Summer
 THERE ISN'T ANY
Winter
 THERE ISN'T ANY

Espanyol
  Kelsey Dossey
  Daniela Cruz
  Dulce Quintana
  Manuela Vanegas
  Katherine Alvarado
  Kenni Thompson
Ex foreign players:
Summer
 THERE ISN'T ANY
Winter
 THERE ISN'T ANY

Granadilla
  Aline Reis
  Nayluisa Cáceres
  Jujuba
  Raissa Feudjio
  Joyce
  Kattie Murray
  Clare Pleuler
  Kayla Adamek
  Tatiana Matveeva
  Ange N'Guessan
  Allegra Poljak
Ex foreign players:
Summer
  Jackie Simpson
Winter
 THERE ISN'T ANY

Levante
  Andreea Părăluță
  Jucinara
  Estefanía Banini
  Nataša Andonova
Ex foreign players:
Summer
  Alvi Luik
  Jéssica Silva
  Verónica Corral
Winter
 THERE ISN'T ANY

Logroño
  Line Johansen
  Ana Carol
  Daniela Caracas
  Dorine Chuigoué
  Grace Asantewaa
  Vanesa Santana
  Barbra Banda
  Dany Helena
  Ida Guehai
  Jade Boho Sayo
  Isadora Freitas
  Pierina Núñez
Ex foreign players:
Summer
  Claire Falknor
Winter
 THERE ISN'T ANY

Madrid CFF
  Antônia
  Aurelle Awona
  Amanda Frisbie
  Jang Sel-gi
  Chidinma Okeke
  Ingrid Wold
  Bruna Tavares
  Rita Chikwelu
  Geyse
  Giovanna Crivelari
  Valéria
Ex foreign players:
Summer
  Eunice Beckmann
Winter
 THERE ISN'T ANY

Rayo Vallecano
  Carla Guerrero
  Camila Sáez
  Linda Bravo
  Oriana Altuve
  Slađana Bulatović
  Yael Oviedo
  Natasha Shirazi
Ex foreign players:
Summer
  Marta Perarnau
Winter
 THERE ISN'T ANY

Real Sociedad
  Kiana Palacios
Ex foreign players:
Summer
 THERE ISNT ANY
Winter
 THERE ISNT ANY

Sevilla
  Aldana Cometti
  Isabella Echiverri
  Sabrina Flores
  Claire Falknor
  Yanara Aedo
  Toni Payne
  Uchenna Kanu
  Liucija Vaitukaitytė
  Emilia Zdunek
Ex foreign players:
Summer 
  Karen Ayana
Winter
 THERE ISNT ANY

Sporting de Huelva
  Chelsea Ashurst
  Selena Babb
  Korina Clavijo
  Ana Jelenčić
  Elena Pavel
  Ernestila Abambila
  Yoko Tanaka
  Princella Adubea
  Marie-Yasmine Alidou
  Danica Evans
  Kristina Fisher
Ex foreign players:
Summer
  Florencia Bonsegundo
Winter
 THERE ISNT ANY

Tacón
  Daiane Limeira
  Osinachi Ohale
  Babett Peter
  Samara Ortiz Cruz
  Aurélie Kaci
  Malena Ortiz
  Thaisa
  Kosovare Asllani
  Sofia Jakobsson
  Jessica Martínez
  Chioma Ubogagu
Ex foreign players:
Summer
  Linda Bravo
Winter
 THERE ISNT ANY

Valencia
  Jennifer Vreugdenhill
  Viola Calligaris
  Mónica Flores
  Mandy van der Berg
  Florencia Bonsegundo
  Natalia Gaitán
  Zenatha Coleman
  Cara Curtin
Ex foreign players:
Summer
  Yanara Aedo
  Jucinara
Winter
 THERE ISNT ANY

League table

Standings

Results

Season statistics

Top goalscorers

Hat-tricks

Notable attendances
32,068 Athletic Club v Barcelona at San Mamés (5 January 2020)
28,367 Real Sociedad v Athletic Club at Reale Arena (13 October 2019)

References

External links
Official Website 
Primera División (women) at La Liga 

2019-20
Spa
1
women's
Spain